is a Japanese architectural translator. Chief of Studio OJMM.
The major fields of his work include translation in architecture and art as well as designing and writing.

Biography
 Makio was born and still lives in Osaka.
 After his master's degree at RMIT University(Australia), he learned about design, architecture and languages of many countries.
 Established Studio OJMM in 2003 and incorporated as Fraze Craze Inc. in 2014.

Bibliography
Major Translations
 Contemporary Architect's Concept Series (INAX Corporation)
 GA series (A.D.A. EDITA Tokyo)
 In charge of translation in "Journal of Architecture and Building Science" of AIJ (Architectural Institute of Japan)

Others
 Planning, editing, and interviewing at "Gakugei Cafe" series (Gakugei Shuppansha Publishing)
 PhD (engineering), First-class registered architect
 First president of Osaka Next Rotary Club

References

External links
 Fraze Craze Inc. Official Website
 Gakugei Cafe (in Japanese)

Living people
Japanese translators
Year of birth missing (living people)